Sacred Heart of Jesus Church or Church of the Sacred Heart of Jesus or variations may refer to:

China 
 Sacred Heart Cathedral of Harbin (formally Sacred Heart of Jesus Diocesan Cathedral of Harbin)
 Sacred Heart Cathedral of Shenyang (formally Sacred Heart of Jesus Diocesan Cathedral in Shenyang)

England 
 Church of the Sacred Heart of Jesus and St Cuthbert, Bedford, England

Hungary 
 Sacred Heart Church (Kőszeg, Hungary) (formally The Church of Jesus’ Heart)

Indonesia 
 Church of the Sacred Heart of Jesus in Ganjuran, Bantul, Indonesia, better known as Ganjuran Church

Malta 
 Sacred Heart of Jesus Church, Fontana (formally Catholic National Sanctuary of the Most Sacred Heart of Jesus)

Malaysia 
Chapel of the Sacred Heart of Jesus (SSPX), Selangor

Portugal 
Estrela Basilica or Royal Basilica and Convent of the Most Sacred Heart of Jesus, Lisbon
Igreja Paroquial do Santissimo Coração de Jesus or Church of the Sacred Heart of Jesus, Lisbon
Church of the Sacred Heart of Jesus (Ermesinde), Valongo, Porto

Syria 
Church of the Sacred Heart of Jesus (Latakia), also known as the Latin Church

United States 
 Basilica of the Sacred Heart of Jesus (Atlanta), also known as Church of the Sacred Heart of Jesus
 Most Sacred Heart of Jesus Catholic Church (Hawi, Hawaii)
 Sacred Heart of Jesus Church (Minneapolis), destroyed by fire on April 19, 2021
 Church of the Sacred Heart of Jesus (New York City)
 Church of the Sacred Hearts of Jesus and Mary (Brooklyn, New York)
 Church of the Sacred Hearts of Mary and Jesus (New York City)
 Sacred Heart of Jesus Church (Bethlehem, Ohio), NRHP-listed
 Sacred Heart of Jesus Church (Cleveland, Ohio)
 Sacred Heart Catholic Church (McCartyville, Ohio), NRHP-listed
 Basilica of the Sacred Heart of Jesus, Conewago, Pennsylvania
 Sacred Heart of Jesus Church (Lawrenceburg, Tennessee), NRHP-listed
 Sacred Heart of Jesus Church (Loretto, Tennessee), NRHP-listed

See also
 Church of the Sacred Heart (disambiguation)

